Seth Jones may refer to:

Seth Jones (political scientist) (born 1972), American political scientist
Seth Jones (ice hockey) (born 1994), American ice hockey defenseman
Seth Jones, a dime novel by Edward S. Ellis, in the E. F. Beadle series of the Beadle Company

Jones, Seth